Michael C. Finnegan (born 1955 in Peekskill, New York) is the managing director of investment banking for JPMorgan Chase. Finnegan is best known as the architect of former Governor George Pataki's ascendancy to power from Mayor of Peekskill to Governor of New York. Finnegan and Pataki became friends while practicing law in Peekskill and Finnegan would go on to manage Pataki's campaigns for Mayor, State Assembly, State Senate, and the Governorship. Finnegan was then appointed Chief Counsel to the Governor in 1995.

He left the Governor's office in 1997 to begin his career with JPMorgan. He previously taught at his alma mater, Siena College, and was awarded the prestigious Ellis Island Medal of Honor in 1997. He serves on the board of directors for the Irish-American Republicans. In 2008, he was mentioned as a possible strong challenger to freshman Congressman John Hall in New York's 19th congressional district. Finnegan is considered an expert in Irish politics, history and tradition.

Political career and background
Finnegan graduated from Siena College  in 1978. He spent a year studying at Ohio University School of Law, until the death of his father caused him to return home in order to support his family. He took a position working in the communication office of James L. Emery, the minority leader of the State Assembly and later worked for Westchester County Executive Andrew P. O'Rourke while attending law school at night at the Pace University School of Law, where he received his Juris Doctor. During his time in Peekskill politics, he became close friends with George Pataki, although Finnegan and Pataki were acquaintances since he was a boy. Finnegan then went to work at Plunkett and Jaffe, P.C., where future Governor Pataki was also a partner.

He managed Pataki's successful campaigns for mayor in 1983, State Assembly in 1984 and 1986, and State Senate in 1992. He also served as General Counsel to the Westchester County Industrial Development Council, as a member of the Peekskill Industrial Development Agency, and part-time as Peekskill's City Prosecutor. By 1992, Finnegan opened his own law firm, working in real estate transactions and environmental law. In 1994, he was architect of Pataki's upset victory for over Governor Mario Cuomo. Pataki and Finnegan were described as politically inseparable.

Finnegan was Governor Pataki's first appointment in the new administration. He served as General Counsel to the Governor from 1995 to 1997, but was also the leading orchestrator of Pataki's measure that cut income tax rates by 25 percent over four years. In 1995, Finnegan ended a century-long debate when he successfully brokered the New York City Watershed Agreement by leading negotiations among county, state, federal and New York City governments, and the environmental community. Finnegan also conceived and negotiated Pataki's $1.75 billion Clean Water Clean Air Bond Act legislation and functioned as Executive Director of the Bond Act Committee.

Pataki also named Finnegan to the three-person Commission on Judicial Nominations, which recommends candidates to the state's highest court. He resigned as General Counsel in 1997 to take a management position with JPMorgan Chase. Upon Finnegan's departure, politicians and political analysts agreed there was a substantial void in the Pataki administration, as Finnegan was a practical negotiator with whom even Pataki's greatest opponents said they could work. Finnegan's allies and foes said "he had a rare talent for overcoming partisan barriers, forging compromise, and keeping the spotlight on his boss when something concrete was achieved".

In 2006, State Comptroller Alan Hevesi took criticism after approving a no-bid contract to JPMorgan, which was negotiated in part by Finnegan, although no wrongdoing was found on Finnegan's part. Hevesi would later resign over a separate incident after he pleaded guilty to a defrauding the government.

2008 congressional run

There was speculation that Finnegan was being recruited by the National Republican Congressional Committee for a run against freshman incumbent John Hall in New York's 19th congressional district. Finnegan was described as one of the strongest potential challengers to Hall.

Finnegan was described as a moderate Republican. He was a delegate for John McCain to the Republican National Convention during the 2008 Republican Presidential Primary.

Notes

External links
Irish-American Republicans
JP Morgan Chase

1955 births
Living people
Politicians from Westchester County, New York
New York (state) Republicans
Siena College alumni
Pace University alumni
American bankers
American financiers
American investors
New York (state) lawyers
State cabinet secretaries of New York (state)
Educators from New York (state)